Elk Park may refer to:

Elk Park, North Carolina
Elk Park Pass, near Butte, Montana